
Wanquan may refer to the following places in China:

Wanquan River (万泉河), a river in Hainan
Wanquan County (万全县), a county in Hebei
Wanquan Subdistrict (万泉街道), a subdistrict in Dadong District, Shenyang, Liaoning

Towns
Wanquan, Gansu (万泉镇), in Zhuanglang County, Gansu
Wanquan, Hainan (万泉镇), in Qionghai, Hainan
Wanquan Town, Hebei, in Wanquan County, Hebei
Wanquan, Hubei (万全镇), in Honghu, Jingzhou, Hubei
Wanquan, Zhejiang (万全镇), in Pingyang County, Zhejiang

Townships
Wanquan Township, Fujian (万全乡), in Jiangle County, Fujian
Wanquan Township, Shanxi (万泉乡), in Wanrong County, Shanxi

Village
Wanquan Village, Wanquan, in Wanquan, Honghu, Jingzhou, Hubei

See also
Wan'an Prefecture, a historical prefecture briefly known as Wanquan Commandery between 757 and 758